The following highways are numbered 804:

Costa Rica
 National Route 804

United States